Lionel Davidson FRSL (31 March 192221 October 2009) was an English novelist who wrote spy thrillers.

Life and career

Lionel Davidson was born in 1922 in Hull in Yorkshire, one of nine children of an immigrant Jewish tailor. He left school early and worked in the London offices of The Spectator magazine as an office boy. Later, he joined the Keystone Press Agency. During the Second World War, he served with the Submarine Service of the Royal Navy.

When the war ended, he returned to the Keystone Agency and travelled all over Europe as a freelance reporter. It was during one of these trips that he came up with the idea for his first thriller, The Night of Wenceslas (1960). The novel is set in Czechoslovakia during the Cold War, and tells the story of young Nicolas Whistler, a 24-year-old Londoner whose business trip to Prague goes horribly awry. The Night of Wenceslas was an instant success, inviting favourable comparisons with Eric Ambler. Davidson became one of the handful of living writers to have their first novel appear in a green Penguin jacket. The book won the Crime Writers' Association's Gold Dagger Award (the top prize for crime and spy fiction in Britain) as well as the Authors' Club First Novel Award. It was filmed as Hot Enough for June (1964), with Dirk Bogarde in the role of Whistler.

His second novel The Rose of Tibet (1962) was equally well received. A Long Way to Shiloh (1966) won Davidson his second Gold Dagger, and he achieved a third with The Chelsea Murders (1978). The Chelsea Murders was also adapted for television as part of Thames TV's Armchair Thriller series in 1981.

Davidson then went into an extended hiatus after the publication of The Chelsea Murders. He was not to write another thriller for the next sixteen years. Kolymsky Heights appeared in 1994 to international acclaim.

Davidson never quite managed to fulfil his early promise to become a major figure in British spy fiction, although his best novels are of high quality. In 2001, he was awarded the CWA's Cartier Diamond Dagger lifetime achievement award, for making "a significant contribution to crime fiction published in the English language".

Davidson wrote a number of children's novels under the pseudonym David Line. Run For Your Life is an example.

Lionel Davidson died on 21 October 2009 in north London after a long illness. Davidson's first wife, the former Fay Jacobs, died in 1988.

Bibliography

Novels

 The Night of Wenceslas (Gold Dagger Award), 1960
 The Rose of Tibet, 1962
 A Long Way to Shiloh (US title: The Menorah Men) (Gold Dagger Award), 1966
 Making Good Again, 1968
 Smith's Gazelle, 1971
 The Sun Chemist, 1976
 The Chelsea Murders, (US title: Murder Games) (Gold Dagger Award), 1978
 Under Plum Lake, 1980 (children's novel)
 Kolymsky Heights, 1994

Novels for young adults published under the pseudonym "David Line"

 Soldier and Me (UK title: Run for Your Life), 1965
 Mike and Me, 1974. More about Mike and Me at www.LionelDavidson.com/mike.html
 Screaming High, 1985.

Short stories

 Note to Survivors - first published in Alfred Hitchcock's Mystery Magazine, May 1958
 Where am I Going? Nowhere! - first published in Suspense (London), February 1961
 Indian Rope Trick - first published in Winter’s Crimes 13, London: Macmillan 1981; reprinted in Mysterious Pleasures London: Little, Brown 2003
 I Do Dwell - first published in Winter's Crimes 16, London: Macmillan 1984
 Tuesday's Child - first published in The Verdict of Us All, Crippen & Landru 2006

References

External links
Official website, set up by his son
Lionel Davidson -  an Appreciation
Appreciation of Davidson's novels
 Lionel Davidson - Daily Telegraph obituary
 The Independent: Obituary
 Dermot Kavanagh's article on Davidson's 'The Chelsea Murders' posted on the London Fictions site
 "Lionel Davidson: the best spy novelist you might never have read", The Telegraph, Nov. 28, 2016

1922 births
2009 deaths
British spy fiction writers
Writers from Kingston upon Hull
Royal Navy personnel of World War II
Cartier Diamond Dagger winners
Fellows of the Royal Society of Literature
Royal Navy submariners
English male novelists
20th-century English novelists
20th-century English male writers